Omma is a genus of beetles in the family Ommatidae. Omma is an example of a living fossil. The oldest species known, O. liassicum, lived during the final stage of the Triassic (Rhaetian), over 200 million years ago, though the placement of this species in Omma has been questioned. Numerous other fossil species are known from the Jurassic and Cretaceous of Europe and Asia. The only living species is Omma stanleyi, which is endemic to Australia. Three other extant species endemic to Australia that were formerly part of this genus were moved to the separate genus Beutelius in 2020. Omma stanleyi is strongly associated with wood, being found under Eucalyptus bark and exhibiting thanatosis when disturbed. Its larval stage and many other life details are unknown due to its rarity. Males are typically 14–20 mm in length, while females are 14.4-27.5 mm. Omma stanleyi occurs throughout eastern Australia from Victoria to Central Queensland.

Description 
According to Li, Huang & Cai, 2021, Omma is distinguished from other ommatid beetles by the following characters:

Species, temporal and spatial distribution 
The following extinct and extant species have been described.

Taxa labelled (?) are considered questionable by Kirejtshuk, 2020

Omma stanleyi , recent, Australia

Fossil species 

 Middle-Late Jurassic, Jiulongshan Formation and Tiaojishan Formation, Inner Mongolia, China,
 Omma ancistrodontum  (Callovian-Oxfordian), Daohugou Village, Shantou Township, Ningcheng County, Inner Mongolia, China
 (?)Omma daxishanense  Upper Jurassic (Oxfordian), China
 Omma delicatum 
 Late Jurassic (Oxfordian and Kimmeridgian) Karabastau Formation, Karatau, Kazakhstan
Omma aberratum 
(?)Omma grande 
Omma jurassicum 
Omma pilosum 
Upper Jurassic (Tithonian), Solnhofen Limestone, Bavaria, Germany
Omma brevipes 
(?)Omma zitteli 
Lower Cretaceous (Aptian), Dzun-Bain Formation, Bon-Tsagan, Mongolia
(?)Omma antennatum 
Omma longicolle 
Mid Cretaceous (Albian-Cenomanian) Burmese amber, Myanmar
Omma davidbatteni 
Omma forte  Li, Huang & Cai, 2021 
Omma janetae 
Omma lii 
Omma manukyani (Kirejtshuk, 2020) formerly placed in separate genus Cionocups.
Omma (Coronomma) axsmithi Jarzembowski, Zheng & Zhao, 2022
Other Species:
 (?)Omma altajense , Middle to Late Jurassic, Togo-Khuduk Formation, Bakhar, Mongolia
Omma avus , Lower Jurassic (Hettangian), Dzhil Formation, Issyk-Kul’, Kyrgyzstan
 (?)Omma elongatum , Lower Cretaceous (Berriasian), Purbeck Group Lower Cretaceous (Hauterivian), Weald Clay, United Kingdom
(?)Omma gobiense , Upper Jurassic (Tithonian), Ulan-Ereg Formation, Khoutiin-Khotgor, Mongolia
Omma liassicum , Late Triassic (Rhaetian), Lilstock Formation, Brown's wood, Warwickshire, Lower Jurassic (Hettangian), Blue Lias, Binton, Warwickshire, Lower Jurassic (Sinemurian), Charmouth Mudstone, Charmouth, England
Omma sibiricum , Lower Cretaceous (Valanginian), Zaza Formation, Baissa, West Transbaikalia Russia

References

Ommatidae
Endemic fauna of Australia
Insects of Australia
Jurassic insects
Cretaceous insects
Mesozoic life of Asia
Rhaetian first appearances
Extant Late Triassic first appearances

Archostemata genera